Commercial Street Platform railway station served the town of Aberdare, in the historical county of Glamorganshire, Wales, from 1904 to 1912 on the Aberdare Railway.

History 
The station was opened on 26 November 1904 by the Taff Vale Railway. There was only one train a day. They didn't let workmen on the train with dirty clothes. It was a short-lived station; the last train was in June 1912.

References 

Disused railway stations in Rhondda Cynon Taf
Railway stations in Great Britain opened in 1904
Railway stations in Great Britain closed in 1912
1904 establishments in Wales
1912 disestablishments in Wales
Former Taff Vale Railway stations